Pranab Kumar Sen (born 7 November 1937 in Calcutta, India) is a statistician, a professor of statistics and the Cary C. Boshamer Professor of Biostatistics at the University of North Carolina at Chapel Hill.

Academic biography
Sen was the second of seven siblings; his father, a railway officer, died of leukemia when Sen was ten, and he was raised by his mother, the daughter of a physician. He began his undergraduate studies at Presidency College, Kolkata, initially intending to study medicine but shifting to statistics when it was discovered that he was too young for medical college. He received a B.S. from the University of Calcutta in 1955, an M.Sc. in 1957, and a Ph.D. in 1962; his doctoral advisor was Hari Kinkar Nandi. He taught for three years at the University of Calcutta and one more year at the University of California, Berkeley before joining the UNC faculty in 1965; although he has held visiting positions at other universities, he has remained at Chapel Hill for the rest of his career. He was the founding co-editor of two journals, Sequential Analysis and Statistics and Decisions, and was joint editor-in-chief of the Journal of Statistical Planning and Inference from 1980 to 1983.

Research and graduate advising
Sen is the author or co-author of multiple books on non-parametric statistics, the advisor of over 80 Ph.D. students, and the author of over 600 research publications. He is known for inventing the Hodges–Lehmann estimator independently of and contemporaneously with Hodges and Lehmann and for the Theil–Sen estimator, a form of robust regression that fits a line to two-dimensional sample points by choosing the slope of the fit line to be the median of the slopes of the lines through pairs of samples.

Awards and honors
Sen is a fellow of the Institute of Mathematical Statistics and of the American Statistical Association. He became the Cary C. Boshamer Professor in 1982. He was the Lukacs Distinguished Visiting Professor at Bowling Green State University in 1996–1997. In 2002, he won the Gottfried E. Noether Senior Scholar Award of the American Statistical Association, and he was the 2010 winner of the Wilks Memorial Award of the ASA "for outstanding contributions to statistical research, especially in nonparametric statistics and biostatistics; and for exceptional service in mentoring doctoral students." The Government of India awarded him the civilian honour of Padma Shri in 2011. In 2012, the University of Calcutta awarded him an honorary Doctor of Science degree.

In 2007, a festschrift was dedicated to him on the occasion of his 70th birthday.

References

1937 births
Living people
American statisticians
Indian statisticians
Presidency University, Kolkata alumni
University of Calcutta alumni
Academic staff of the University of Calcutta
University of California, Berkeley faculty
University of North Carolina at Chapel Hill faculty
Recipients of the Padma Shri in civil service
Fellows of the American Statistical Association
20th-century Indian mathematicians
Scientists from Kolkata
Mathematical statisticians